Minuscule 480 (in the Gregory-Aland numbering), δ 462 (in the Soden numbering), is a Greek minuscule manuscript of the New Testament, on parchment. It is dated by a colophon to the year 1366. The manuscript is lacunose.
The manuscript was adapted for liturgical use. It has marginalia. It contains liturgical books with hagiographies: Synaxarion and Menologion.

Scrivener labelled it by number 568.

Description 

The codex contains the text of the New Testament except Book of Revelation on 268 parchment leaves (size ), with only one lacuna (Hebrews 12:17-13:25). The text is written in one column per page, 23 lines per page.
The vellum is fine and white.

The leaves 225-226 were supplied by a later hand on paper (flyleaves). It has decorated headpieces and initial letters at the beginning of each Gospel (folios 3, 63, 101, 163). The titles, initials, and capital letters in gold (chrysography).

The text of the Gospels has no additional division according to the smaller Ammonian Sections, with references to the Eusebian Canons.

Lacuna in Hebrews 12:17-13:25 was supplied by a later hand on paper.

The order of books: Gospels, Acts, Catholic epistles, and the Pauline epistles (Philemon, Hebrews).

There are only 4 instances of N ephelkystikon, 37 occurrences of the error of itacism. The breathings and accents are complete and regular. Iota adscriptum never occurs, iota subscriptum 13 times in Matthew.

There are only a few corrections made by a later hand.

Text 

The Greek text of the codex is a representative of the Byzantine text-type. Hermann von Soden classified it to the textual family Kr. Kurt Aland placed it in Category V.
According to the Claremont Profile Method it represents the textual family Family Kr in Luke 1, Luke 10, and Luke 20 as perfect member of the family.
Textually it is close to the codex 201. In some cases it supports readings of the codices Vaticanus, Ephraemi Rescriptus, Bezae, Cyprius, and Regius.

It has several unique readings in Matthew 6:1; 9:5; 20:29; 26:65; Luke 1:11; 16:3; 17:6; John 14:30. Two rare readings from Luke 9:48 and John 1:28 are supported by the Codex Wordsworth and 201.

Matthew 9:5

History 

According to the colophon (on folio 222 verso) the manuscript was written by one Joasaph on 4 June 1366 CE (θεου το δωρον και πονος ιωασαφ ετει ςωοδ), in monastery of the Theotokos ton Hodegon, in Constantinople.

It once belonged to Charles Burney, along with codices 481, 482, 484, 485, and ℓ 184. It was purchased to the British Museum in 1818.

The manuscript was examined and collated by Scrivener, who published its text in 1852. The manuscript was added to the list of New Testament manuscripts by Scrivener (568) and Gregory (480).

It is currently housed at the British Library (Burney 18, 222 fol.) in London.

See also 

 List of New Testament minuscules
 Biblical manuscript
 Textual criticism

References

Further reading 

 F. H. A. Scrivener, A Full and Exact Collation of About 20 Greek Manuscripts of the Holy Gospels (Cambridge and London, 1852), p. XLVI-XLVIII. (as n)
 F. H. A. Scrivener, An Exact Transcript of the Codex Augiensis (Cambridge and London, 1859), p. 63. (as j)

External links 

 Burney 18 at the British Library

Greek New Testament minuscules
14th-century biblical manuscripts
Burney Collection
14th-century illuminated manuscripts